812 Adele (prov. designation:  or ) is an elongated Eunomia asteroid from the central regions of the asteroid belt. It was discovered on 8 September 1915, by Russian astronomer Sergey Belyavsky at the Simeiz Observatory on the Crimean peninsula. It was likely named after the character "Adele" in the opera Die Fledermaus by Johann Strauss.

Orbit and classification 

When applying the hierarchical clustering method to its proper orbital elements, Adele is a core member of the Eunomia family, a prominent family of stony S-type asteroids and the largest one in the intermediate main belt with more than 5,000 known members. It orbits the Sun in the central asteroid belt at a distance of 2.2–3.1 AU once every 4 years and 4 months (1,585 days; semi-major axis of 2.66 AU). Its orbit has an eccentricity of 0.16 and an inclination of 13° with respect to the ecliptic.

Discovery 

Adele was discovered by Russian astronomer Sergey Belyavsky at the Simeiz Observatory on the Crimean peninsula 8 September 1915. Three nights later, on 11 September 1915, it was independently discovered by Max Wolf the Heidelberg Observatory in Germany. The Minor Planet Center however, only credits the first discoverer. The body's observation arc begins at the Bergedorf Observatory on 19 September 1915, less than two weeks after its official discovery observation.

Naming 

This minor planet was likely named after "Adele", Rosalinde's maid, a character in the operetta Die Fledermaus by Johann Strauss (1825–1899). The name was given by the independent discoverer Max Wolf. The author of the Dictionary of Minor Planet Names, Lutz Schmadel, learned about the meaning of the asteroid's name from R. Bremer and Ingrid van Houten-Groeneveld, latter who worked as a young astronomer at Heidelberg.

Physical characteristics 

Based on the overall spectral type of the Eunomia family, Adele is likely a common, stony S-type asteroid.

Rotation period 

In October 2002, a rotational lightcurve of Adele was obtained from photometric observations by French amateur astronomer René Roy. Lightcurve analysis gave a well-defined rotation period of  hours with a high brightness variation of  magnitude, indicative of an elongated shape.

In 2016, a modeled lightcurve gave a concurring sidereal period of  hours using data from the Uppsala Asteroid Photometric Catalogue, the Palomar Transient Factory survey, and individual observers (such as above), as well as sparse-in-time photometry from the NOFS, the Catalina Sky Survey, and the La Palma surveys . The study also determined two spin axes at (301.0°, 44.0°) and (154.0°, 69.0°) in ecliptic coordinates (λ, β).

Diameter and albedo 

The Collaborative Asteroid Lightcurve Link assumes a standard albedo for an Eunomian asteroid of 0.21 and calculates a diameter of 12.66 kilometers based on an absolute magnitude of 11.8.

References

External links 
 Lightcurve Database Query (LCDB), at www.minorplanet.info
 Dictionary of Minor Planet Names, Google books
 Asteroids and comets rotation curves, CdR – Geneva Observatory, Raoul Behrend
 Discovery Circumstances: Numbered Minor Planets (1)-(5000) – Minor Planet Center
 
 

000812
Discoveries by Sergei Belyavsky
19150908